Fastjet Limited is a UK based holding company of fastjet Zimbabwe, an airline operating in Africa. The airline was initially created following the acquisition of Fly540, an airline operating in East Africa; flights in fastjet's own name commenced in November 2012 in Tanzania.

Fastjet Zimbabwe commenced flights in October 2015, and Fastjet Mozambique in November 2017. Plans have also been announced for domestic operations in South Africa.

History

Initial proposals 
In June 2012, to start the operations, Rubicon Diversified Investments Plc (later renamed Fastjet Plc) completed the acquisition of Lonrho's airline division for a transaction value of US$85.7m, satisfied by the issue of Rubicon ordinary shares to Lonrho. Key shareholders in the enlarged company would be Lonrho and Sir Stelios Haji-Ioannou, through his easyGroup Holdings Limited (“easyGroup”). The airline division acquired included the African regional airline Fly 540, operating in Kenya, Sudan, Tanzania and Uganda, which would form the platform for the development of a low-cost carrier for Africa, branded ‘Fastjet’ under the terms of the easyGroup brand licence agreement.

The airline chose Dar es Salaam, Tanzania, as its first operating base in Africa, with flights from Julius Nyerere International Airport commencing on 29 November 2012. Initially flights operated successfully between Dar es Salaam and Kilimanjaro, and between Dar es Salaam and Mwanza. Further routes were to be added quickly, both domestically and to other East African destinations.

Expansion of services 
As well as expanding services from the base in Tanzania, in October 2015 the company obtained an Air Operator's Certificate (AOC) for Zimbabwe, and fastjet Zimbabwe was launched. The initial flights between its base at Harare International Airport to Victoria Falls commenced on 28 October 2015, and flights to Johannesburg commenced from 1 February 2016 and flights to Nelspruit Kruger Mpumalanga and Maun Botswana have recently been announced from Victoria Falls commencing on 16 March 30 June 2022. 

With troubled operations and continued losses, majority shareholder Stelios Haji-Ioannou through his holding in EasyGroup successfully changed the board of fastjet Plc with the departure of six board members in a short period of time. Ed Winters was replaced as CEO by Nico Bezuidenhout, from rival low-cost airline MangoSA, on 1 August 2016.[KJ1] [NN2] 

Bezuidenhout instigated a 'Stabilisation Plan', which included reducing unprofitable routes, switching[KJ3] [NN4] from A319s to (smaller) Embraer ERJ145 aircraft and moving the airline's headquarters from London Gatwick Airport to Africa - later revealed as a move to Johannesburg. The aim was to achieve cashflow breakeven in the fourth quarter of 2017. As part of a further fundraising in September 2017, to raise not less than US$44m.

At the time of the fundraising, it was announced in September 2017 that domestic flights would be launched in both Mozambique and South Africa, by way of brand licence agreements with Solenta Aviation Mozambique and Federal Airlines respectively. Both were established  airlines, but only flew small aircraft, operating air shuttle, scheduled and charter services. Fastjet Mozambique commenced operations on 3 November 2017 with flights from Maputo to Beira, Nampula and Tete.

2017 also saw fastjet revise the company slogan from smart travel to for everyone, further reinforcing the company's mandate to make air travel in Africa more affordable and open to all, particularly those who never thought it possible.

As of February 2018, CEO Nico Bezuidenhout continues to build on fastjet's current routes, with the launch of a Dar es Salaam to Kigoma flight. The airline launched daily flights between Harare and Bulawayo on 20 July 2018, marking it as the most affordable airline to operate the Harare Bulawayo route. More route launches were expected throughout the course of the year.

As of September 2019, CEO Nico Bezuidenhout resigned as the chief executive officer of fastjet. He has been replaced by Mark Hurst.

At the end of the financial year fastjet achieved profits for the first time in its history. However during the height of the lockdown period the airline suspended flights across its network following the closure of borders between Zimbabwe and South Africa. Fastjet performed numerous repatriation flights during this period reuniting families and transporting essential staff between the two countries.

The highlight for 2021 was taking delivery of a fourth Embraer ERJ aircraft that was introduced into service on the Harare Bulawayo route. Fastjet in 2021 announced two key partnerships in Zimbabwe with the leading fast food outlet Chicken Inn and the country’s biggest bank CBZ Bank as payment channels for the airline’s tickets. 

The value based extended its Flexible Booking Policy to end of March 2022 allowing customers to change their flights to a future date at no extra cost. 

At the beginning of 2022 fastjet announced the launch of flights from Victoria Falls to Maun in Botswana on 4 times a week basis effective 30 June 2022. This becomes the second route that the airline would have launched in 2022 after flights from Victoria Falls to Nelspruit Kruger Mpumalanga.

Corporate Affairs

Ownership and structure
Fastjet Limited is a company incorporated and domiciled in England and Wales and, until 24 August 2020, was traded on the London Stock Exchange Alternative Investment Market (AIM) (FJET:LSE).  Estimated major interests in ordinary shares (as at April 2017) are:

The Group functions of Fastjet Limited head office, and several dormant holding companies, have, since 2019, been reported as fastjet Central Systems, which is responsible for the supply of all booking systems, brand compliance and oversight, and revenue accounting, for any Fastjet branded airline operations, for which it charges a management fee to the supported airline.

Two airlines are currently operational: Fastjet Zimbabwe, domestically in Zimbabwe and internationally, and FedAir, with mainly charter and safari business in South Africa:

Operations of fastjet Zambia Ltd (49.5%) and fastjet Mozambique Limitada (100%) have currently been discontinued. (Fastjet Tanzania, the original fastjet operation, was sold on 26 November 2018.) 

The subsidiaries are included in the Group financial statements, because although the Group holds 50% or less of the voting rights in each, it controls the management, operations and distributions through contractual agreements as well as its shareholding.

Brand ownership
The Fastjet brand was originally owned by Easygroup Holdings Ltd, and licensed to Fastjet Plc.  On 29 June 2017 Fastjet Plc entered into an agreement with Easygroup Holdings Ltd to acquire all intellectual property rights associated with the fastjet brand for $2.5 million.
Sir Stelios Haji-Ioannou, who established the fastjet brand in 2012, stated, “fastjet is a great brand in all its African markets, making it a highly valuable asset for the company. I have accepted the view of the current board that the company should own its own brand rather than licence it from me.”

Business trends
Fastjet Limited group results are shown below (as at years ending 31 December):

Head office
Fastjet's Group head office is  located in South Africa[2].  Prior to 2017, it was based at London Gatwick Airport in Crawley, West Sussex. The move to South Africa was done to lower the cost of doing business. The registered office and Fastjet plc head office is in London. Each locally incorporated airline has a registered/head office in its country of operation.[19]

Destinations 
As of October 2022, Fastjet serves the following destinations in three African countries:

Fleet 

Current fleet

fastjet operates four Embraer 145 aircraft.

The ERJ145 seats up to 50 passengers. This aircraft operates across all fastjet routes, in Zimbabwe, South Africa and Botswana.

The airline's name and URL is painted on the body of the aircraft with the company mascot "Mr Percy Grey" placed on the tail of the plane. Touches of red and yellow can be seen on the aircraft's wings and engines.

Historical fleet

Previously, fastjet operated the Airbus A319 and the Embraer E190. Due to passenger load on routes, these aircraft were replaced in favour of the smaller Embraer aircraft.

References

External links
Official website (Contact Details)

Airline holding companies
Companies based in Crawley